Wilhelm Possak, also known as Vilmos Possák (born 1905), was a Romanian football player and coach.

Playing career
Possak played as a striker in Romania for CA Timișoara. He later played in Hungary for Vasas SC, and in Portugal for Sporting CP.

He earned two caps for the Romanian national team in 1928, making his debut when he replaced Aurel Guga at half-time in a friendly against Turkey which ended with a 4–2 victory. He scored his only goal for the national team in a 3–1 loss against Yugoslavia.

Coaching career
Possak managed Sporting CP of Portugal between 1935 and 1937.

References

External links

1905 births
Date of death missing
Romanian footballers
Romania international footballers
CA Timișoara players
Újpest FC players
Sporting CP footballers
Association football forwards
Romanian football managers
Sporting CP managers
Romanian expatriate footballers
Romanian expatriates in Hungary
Expatriate footballers in Hungary
Expatriate footballers in Portugal
Romanian expatriate football managers
Expatriate football managers in Portugal
Sportspeople from Timișoara

Romanian expatriate sportspeople in Portugal